War Eagle, Arkansas is a feature film based on two real-life friends, Tim Ballany and Vincent Insalaco III, growing up together in Arkansas and facing a crossroads in life as they graduate from high school. The character of "Wheels" is portrayed by New York actor Dan McCabe, who convincingly recreates Ballany's Cerebral Palsy. The best friend role of "Enoch" is portrayed by Luke Grimes, as a troubled teen who excels at baseball but struggles with stuttering and confidence problems. Other stars in the film include Brian Dennehy, Mary Kay Place, Mare Winningham and James McDaniel. The film was shot entirely in Northwest Arkansas, primarily in Eureka Springs, Huntsville and Fayetteville and has won over 20 independent film festival awards, including Best Picture and Best Actor at major festivals such as the Breckenridge Film Festival, the Hollywood Film Festival and California Independent Film Festival. The film's budget was a modest $1.1 million, and was provided by Executive Producer Vincent Insalaco, Sr. and a group of private investors. Of additional benefit to the film was a grant from Panavision, under a new filmmaker's program, which was based in large part on the screenplay by Graham Gordy, whose other film credits include The Love Guru and My Dog Skip. War Eagle, Arkansas was released in the U.S. by Empire Film Group on June 12, 2009.

External links
Official film website
War Eagle, Arkansas

2007 films
Films shot in Arkansas
Films set in Arkansas
Works about cerebral palsy and other paralytic syndromes
2000s English-language films